The Izvorul Negru is a right tributary of the river Uz in Romania. It discharges into the Uz in Sălătruc near Dărmănești.

References

Rivers of Romania
Rivers of Bacău County